Javier Soler Gandia (born 20 February 1997) is a Spanish footballer who plays for Getafe CF B. Mainly a central defender, he can also play as a midfielder.

Club career
Soler was born in Ontinyent, Valencian Community, and represented Ontinyent CF, CD Alcoyano and Córdoba CF as a youth. He made his senior debut with the reserves on 12 May 2016, starting in a 1–3 Tercera División away loss against UD Los Barrios.

Soler made his first team debut on 2 December 2017, starting in a 1–3 loss at SD Huesca in the Segunda División. The following 10 July he moved to another reserve team, Atlético Levante UD in the third level.

References

External links

1997 births
Living people
Spanish footballers
Footballers from the Valencian Community
Association football defenders
Association football midfielders
Segunda División players
Segunda División B players
Tercera División players
Córdoba CF B players
Córdoba CF players
Atlético Levante UD players
Getafe CF B players